Bingham Township may refer to:
 Bingham Township, Hancock County, Iowa
 Bingham Township, Clinton County, Michigan
 Bingham Township, Huron County, Michigan
 Bingham Township, Leelanau County, Michigan
 Bingham Township, Orange County, North Carolina, in Orange County, North Carolina
 Bingham Township, Traill County, North Dakota, in Traill County, North Dakota
 Bingham Township, Potter County, Pennsylvania

Township name disambiguation pages